José María Rodero Luján (26 December 1922 – 14 May 1991) was a Spanish actor, whose career spanned over 40 years.

In 1947, he married with actress Elvira Quintillá, the couple remained together until his death in 1991 while he was preparing for the premiere of the play Hazme una noche.

Selected filmography
 Unknown Path (1946)
 Anguish (1947)
 Spanish Serenade (1952)
 La becerrada (1963)
 Cabaret Woman (1974)

References

External links

1922 births
1991 deaths
Male actors from Madrid
Spanish male film actors
Spanish male stage actors
Spanish male television actors
20th-century Spanish male actors